The Peel Sessions is an EP by the English rock band the Smiths. The EP, which was released in 1988, was recorded on 18 May 1983, for the BBC Radio 1 disc jockey John Peel's show which was subsequently broadcast on 31 May 1983. All but "Miserable Lie" were already included on the 1984 album Hatful of Hollow.

Track listing
"What Difference Does It Make?" – 3:12
"Miserable Lie" – 4:38
"Reel Around the Fountain" – 5:51
"Handsome Devil" – 2:46

References

Smiths, The
The Smiths EPs
1988 EPs
Live EPs
1988 live albums
The Smiths live albums
Strange Fruit Records live albums
Strange Fruit Records EPs